Flight 763 may refer to

EgyptAir Flight 763, crashed on 19 March 1972
Saudia Flight 763, mid-air collision on 12 November 1996

0763